Lucien John Maciora (August 17, 1902 – October 19, 1993) was a U.S. Representative from Connecticut.

Born in New Britain, Connecticut, to Polish immigrants, Maciora attended high school.
Grocer.
He served as a member of the New Britain, Connecticut, common council from 1926 to 1934.
Business owner.
He served as a member of the Connecticut House of Representatives from 1932 to 1937.
He served as chairman of the New Britain, Connecticut, police board from 1934 to 1940.
Insurance agent.

Maciora was elected as a Democrat to the Seventy-seventh Congress (January 3, 1941 – January 3, 1943).
He was an unsuccessful candidate for reelection to the Seventy-eighth Congress in 1942.
City tax collector, New Britain, Connecticut, from 1950 to 1969.
He died on October 19, 1993, in New Britain, Connecticut.
He was interred in Sacred Heart Cemetery, New Britain, Connecticut.

References

Sources

1902 births
1993 deaths
Democratic Party members of the Connecticut House of Representatives
American politicians of Polish descent
Democratic Party members of the United States House of Representatives from Connecticut
20th-century American politicians
Politicians from New Britain, Connecticut